The Georgia Straight is a free Canadian weekly news and entertainment newspaper published in Vancouver, British Columbia, by Overstory Media Group. Often known simply as The Straight, it is delivered to newsboxes, post-secondary schools, public libraries and a large variety of other locations.

As surveyed by VAC its per-issue circulation average , is 119,971 copies, and its average weekly readership is 804,000 . Its website traffic ranked 92,215 globally and 5,395 within Canada,  from Alexa. 
The Straight has a long history of independent, unconventional editorials and content, and is known as a vocal critic of government, notably the former Liberal government of Gordon Campbell.

In January 2020, the newspaper's acquisition by Media Central Corporation was announced, a few weeks after the same company announced a deal to acquire the similar Toronto publication Now. In September 2022, after Media Central Corporation filed for bankruptcy, the Straight was acquired by Overstory Media Group.

History

The paper was founded as an underground newspaper in May 1967 by Pierre Coupey, Milton Acorn, Dan McLeod, Stan Persky, and others, and originally it operated as a collective.

On May 5, 1967, the first issue was presented and cost ten cents. It was originally a biweekly newspaper. On May 12, Dan McLeod was taken away in a paddy wagon and jailed for three hours for "investigation of vagrancy." College Printers refused to print the second issue,  but an alternative was found.

In 1972, original staff members left Georgia Straight to publish the competitor bi-weekly The Grape.

Suspension over "obscenities"
The paper was raided and fined by the Vancouver Police for publishing obscenities, and was often banned from distribution for its criticism of the local police and politicians.  Vancouver mayor Tom Campbell described the paper as "filth" and, objecting of its sale to "school children," urged the city's licensing inspector to suspend the paper for "gross misconduct" contrary to city bylaws. 

The British Columbia Civil Liberties Association (BCCLA) challenged the suspension in court by arguing that only federal laws could restrict freedom-of-the-press.  The initial challenge was unsuccessful, with Justice Thomas Dohm praising the mayor for his actions.  On appeal, the appellate court agreed to lift the suspension on the grounds that a hearing should have been provided to explain why the paper was suspended, but did not rule on the BCCLA's freedom-of-the-press argument.

The BCCLA provided further legal assistance to Dan McLeod and the paper when both were criminally charged with three counts of obscenity for publishing a photograph, an advertisement described as being titled "Young man wants to meet women to 30 years old for Muffdiving, etc," and an article titled "Penis de Milo Created by Cynthia Plaster-Caster."  McLeod and the paper were acquitted on all three charges due to the Crown having failed to prove its case beyond a reasonable doubt, with the judge noting that no evidence was provided as to the meaning of the word muffdiving and that he could not take judicial notice of a word that he had not previously heard.

Those controversies ended in the 1970s, as the paper moved to become a more conventional news and entertainment weekly, albeit with a progressive editorial slant. Bob Geldof worked as a music journalist for the Georgia Straight in the 1970s before he returned to Ireland and joined the Boomtown Rats. In the mid-1990s a second Straight newspaper in Calgary, Alberta, called the Calgary Straight was produced, however, its existence was brief.

BC government tax case 
Regulatory controversy erupted again in October 2003, when the provincial government sent The Straight a bill totalling more than $1 million for outstanding provincial sales tax. In British Columbia, print publications must have at least 25 per cent editorial content to be considered a newspaper, and qualify for exemption from PST on printing bills. The extensive "Time Out" listing of the paper, detailing the what and where of virtually every public event in the city, was judged to be advertising – pushing the paper below the required thresholds for a newspaper.

Publisher Dan McLeod said this re-interpretation of the rules was a politically motivated attempt to silence a persistent critic:

"We're the only paper that is consistently critical of the government in our editorials week after week, and we're the only paper that's being fined a million dollars," he said. "So I put two and two together."

However, not everyone agreed with McLeod's interpretation of events and pointed out that The Straight had a significantly lower editorial-to-advertising ratio than many other alternative and university papers.  This highly public battle garnered considerable attention, and the BC government later reversed their decision, stating "clearly the Georgia Straight is a newspaper..."

Acquisition by Media Central Corporation Inc. 
On March 2, 2020, Media Central Corporation Inc. announced it has closed its acquisition of Vancouver Free Press Corp, owner and operator of the Georgia Straight. The company paid $1.25 million (included fees associated with the transaction) in cash and shares. Media Central Corporation filed for bankruptcy in March 2022. Long-time editors and contributors to the Georgia Straight continued publishing, even as regular paycheques stopped coming in.

Acquisition by Overstory Media Group 
On September 27, 2022, Overstory Media Group announced it had acquired the assets of the Georgia Straight for an undisclosed sum. Around a dozen remaining employees at the Straight, including longstanding editor Charlie Smith, were fired shortly before the acquisition and did not receive unpaid wages, severance, or vacation pay. Overstory Media Group has declined to pay back wages, calling it the responsibility of the previous owner. 

The company announced that its first action would be to reinstate the Straight's arts and culture focus, which the previous owners had attempted to eliminate.
In fact, staff continued covering arts and culture through 2020, 2021, and 2022. As of 2023, the Straight has hired a dedicated music editor and is hiring to expand its arts and food coverage.

Readership

A readership survey conducted on behalf of The Georgia Straight in 2007 found that:

Content

The Straight carries feature articles, ranging from social topics, such as drug use and gentrification to in-depth looks at cultural newsmakers like the writer Salman Rushdie.  Former editor Charlie Smith has a record of covering women's movement issues as well as COVID-19, the climate, diverse communities, and arts and culture.  There are also many articles and listings on lifestyle and entertainment, commenting on restaurants, new wines, new gadgets, designer clothes, and the latest in music, theatre, and movies. Rounding out the regular features are the well-known American advice columnist Dan Savage with his Savage Love, commentator Gwynne Dyer, cartoons, and a local astrology column. The newspaper's editorial slant is strongly left wing as conceived in the Canadian political spectrum.

Special editions of The Straight include:
The Golden Plate Awards – March
The Best of Vancouver – September

The Best of Vancouver is a well known feature with whimsical notions of the best place for outdoor sex mixed in with more conventional awards such as Best Dining, Best Bar & Club and Best Radio Station.

The Straight has been criticised for publishing cigarette and other tobacco advertising when most publications in Canada have declined to do so for moral and ethical reasons.  And of promoting local events that had tobacco industry sponsorship, such as the formerly Benson and Hedges-sponsored Symphony of Fire. The Straight has long been condemned for this practice by the major health groups and, more recently, by Vancouver businessman and political candidate Dale Jackaman in a series of Google attack ads.

Awards
The paper has received many awards. For example, in 1995, it received five "Western Magazine Awards", and, in the two years up to June 1996, it was nominated more than forty times and won twenty prizes, including three National Magazine Awards. In 1999, The Straight won eight Western Magazine Awards, including "Magazine of the Year", and its seventh consecutive, "Best Business Article".

On May 23, 2009, The Georgia Straight won the prize for "best magazine article of the year" for "The Pill Pushers" by Alex Roslin from the Canadian Association of Journalists.

The paper also gives many awards based on readers' polls:

". . . the Golden Plate Awards for local restaurants, the Straight Music Awards for local musicians, and the Best of Vancouver Awards for every type of business, service, activity, and weird stuff in the city, from the best bowling alley to the best Vancouver excuse for being late for work."

See also
List of newspapers in Canada
List of underground newspapers of the 1960s counterculture

References

External links
 

Alternative weekly newspapers published in Canada
Newspapers published in Vancouver
Newspapers established in 1967
1967 establishments in British Columbia
Weekly newspapers published in British Columbia